Mieskuoro Huutajat (Men's Choir Shouters) is an internationally famous shouting choir from Oulu, Finland. They were established in 1987 and originally comprised 20 shouting men, since expanded to 30.

Led by conductor , the choir is best known for their loud renditions of Finnish patriotic songs, but have also performed foreign tunes such as The Star-Spangled Banner.

They were guest performers at Congratulations, a special 50th anniversary concert for the Eurovision Song Contest held in Copenhagen, Denmark in October 2005, at which they performed Waterloo. Co-host Renars Kaupers suggested jokingly that perhaps Finland's notoriously poor performances at Eurovision in future could be remedied by the choir performing their own songs. This suggestion was somewhat ironic, as Finland won the subsequent contest.

The performances show some similarities to the traditional Māori's haka war cries.

Documentary film

The choir was portrayed in a documentary film Screaming Men, released in 2003, directed by Mika Ronkainen.

References

External links
 
 Official site of the film Screaming Men
 The Shouting Men of Finland, BBC
 

Finnish choirs
Musical groups established in 1987
Culture in Oulu